Several British and other universities have debating societies called The Union or a variation on that. These include:

Oxford Union
Cambridge Union Society
University of St Andrews Union Debating Society
Durham Union Society
University of Limerick Debating Union
Manchester Debating Union